The 73rd Regiment of Foot (Invalids) was an infantry regiment of the British Army from 1762 to 1768.

History
The regiment was originally raised as a regiment of invalids in February 1762, and numbered the 116th Foot; it was renumbered as the 73rd the following year, and disbanded in 1769.

References

Infantry regiments of the British Army
Military units and formations established in 1762
1769 disestablishments in Great Britain